"Antenna" is a song by English-Ghanaian recording artist Fuse ODG. The song premiered on BBC Radio 1Xtra on 12 August 2012, and featured on Fuse ODG's EP The Buzz, released in September 2012. It was released as a single in the United Kingdom through 3 Beat Productions on 2 June 2013, and became his first chart entry, debuting and peaking at number 7 on the UK Singles Chart, as well as reaching number 9 in Scotland.

Music video
A music video to accompany the release of "Antenna" was first released onto YouTube on 16 December 2012 at a total length of four minutes and ten seconds.

Track listing

Charts

Weekly charts

Year-end charts

Certifications

Release history

References

2013 debut singles
2013 songs
Fuse ODG songs